Anıl Dilaver (born November 20, 1990) is a Turkish footballer. He was born in Trabzon, and plays as a forward for Bayburt Grup Özel İdarespor.

References

External links

1990 births
Living people
People from Sürmene
Turkish footballers
Galatasaray A2 footballers
Galatasaray S.K. footballers
Süper Lig players
Turkey under-21 international footballers
TFF First League players

Association football forwards